This is a list of The Thinker sculptures made by Auguste Rodin. The Thinker, originally a part of Rodin's The Gates of Hell, exists in several versions. The original size and the later monumental size versions were both created by Rodin, and the most valuable versions are those created under his supervision. There was also a limited edition of 12 copies made from the original plaster mold by the Musée Rodin after Rodin's death.

The Thinker exists as bronze casts, exhibition plaster casts (some were painted to look like bronze patina), and original production plasters, which some consider art objects today.

Copies of The Thinker made during Rodin's lifetime

Later casts

Europe

 France
 Saint-Paul de Vence
 Germany
 Alte Nationalgalerie, Berlin
 Sächsisches Landesgymnasium Sankt Afra zu Meißen, Meissen
 Kunsthalle Bielefeld, Bielefeld
 Netherlands
 Apollolaan, in front of the Amsterdam Hilton Hotel
 Singer Laren, Laren (badly damaged by thieves in 2007; restored and re-exhibited in 2010)
 Norway
 National Gallery of Norway, Oslo
 Russia
 Pushkin Museum of Fine Arts, Moscow
 Serbia
 University of Arts, Belgrade
 Switzerland
 Kunsthaus Zürich, Zürich
 Turkey
 Sakıp Sabancı Museum, Istanbul
 Bakırköy Psychiatric Hospital, Istanbul
 United Kingdom
 Burrell Collection (Pollok House), Glasgow, Scotland
 Vatican City
 Vatican Museums, Collection of Modern Religious Art

North America

 Canada
 Montreal Museum of Fine Art, Montreal
 Art Gallery of Ontario, Toronto
 MacLaren Art Centre, Barrie
 Mexico
 Museo Soumaya, Mexico City
 United States
Cantor Fitzgerald offices in World Trade Center, New York City (survived the September 11 attacks; missing afterwards)
 Columbia University, New York City
 Maryhill Museum of Art, Goldendale
 Bal Harbour Shops, Miami
 Martin Lawrence Gallery, Las Vegas
 University of Louisville, Louisville
 Baltimore Museum of Art, Baltimore
 Rodin Museum, Philadelphia
 Nelson-Atkins Museum of Art, Kansas City
 Norton Simon Museum, Pasadena
North Carolina Museum of Art, Raleigh
 Iris & B. Gerald Cantor Center for Visual Arts, Stanford University, Stanford
Bodies: The Exhibition, originally Tampa (travelling; a recreation made from a plastinated human corpse posed like the original sculpture)
 Detroit Institute of Arts, Detroit, Michigan

South America
 Argentina
 Museum of Modern Art, Buenos Aires
 Brazil
 Ricardo Brennand Institute, Recife
 Lily Marinho collection, Rio de Janeiro
 Chile
 Borde Costero, Viña del Mar

Asia

 China
 China Central Academy of Fine Arts library, Beijing
 Guangzhou Opera House, Guangzhou
 Shanghai Library, Shanghai
 Changchun World Sculpture Park, Changchun
 India
 Sri Venkateswara University, Tirupati
 Thinkers Park at Jawaharlal Institute of Postgraduate Medical Education and Research, Pondicherry
 Nalsar University of Law, Shamirpet
 Indonesia
 Kolese Kanisius, Jakarta
 Israel
 RAD Data Communications, Tel Aviv
 Japan
 The National Museum of Western Art, Tokyo
 Kyoto National Museum, Kyoto
 Shizuoka Prefectural Museum of Art, Shizuoka
 Singapore
 OUE Bayfront, Marina Bay
 Resorts World Sentosa, Sentosa Island
 South Korea
 Beartree Park, Chungchongnam-do
 Taiwan
 National Tsing Hua University, Hsinchu
 Vietnam
 FPT University, Danang campus
 FPT University, Cantho campus
FPT University, Quynhon campus

See also
List of sculptures by Auguste Rodin

References

External links 

The Thinker project, Munich. Discussion of the history of the many casts of this artwork.
Rodin: The B. Gerald Cantor Collection, a full text exhibition catalog from The Metropolitan Museum of Art, which contains material on The Thinker

Sculptures by Auguste Rodin
Collection of the Baltimore Museum of Art
Bronze sculptures in Japan
Bronze sculptures in the United States
Sculptures of the Nelson-Atkins Museum of Art
Lists of sculptures